Oakland University Credit Union (OUCU) is the official financial services partner of Oakland University and is a brand of Michigan State University Federal Credit Union. The Auburn Hills branch was opened in Oakland County, Michigan, in 1967 to better serve members at the nearby MSU-Oakland University.

Over the 56 years of partnership with Oakland University, the Oakland branch was rebranded to Oakland University Credit Union in 2014, and an on-campus branch was opened in the Oakland Center. Several ATMs were also added to educational buildings and residence halls on campus.

Prior to becoming Oakland University’s official credit union, MSU Federal Credit Union donated over $5 million to OU, earmarking initiatives such as scholarships and grants.

References

Oakland University
Credit unions based in Michigan
Banks established in 1967